William Edward Phillips (born 12 February 1987), also known by his stage name Tourist, is an English electronic musician and songwriter.

Biography
In 2015 he won the Grammy Award for Song of the Year for co-writing Sam Smith's "Stay with Me", along with James Napier. Since then, he has gone on to release four full-length albums, U (6 May 2016), Everyday (15 February 2019), Wild (18 October 2019) and Inside Out (20 May 2022) alongside several more EPs. He remains active as a writer, producer, and remixer, including remixing artists like Christine & The Queens, Hozier, Wolf Alice, and Chvrches.

Discography

Albums
 U (2016)
 Everyday (2019)
 Wild (2019)
 Inside Out (2022)

Extended plays
 Tourist (2012)
 Tonight (2013)
 Patterns (2014)
 Wash (2017)
 Wild (Reworks) (2020)

Singles

Songwriting and production credits

Remixes
 Sharon Van Etten – "We Are Fine" (2012)
 Montevideo – "Castles" (2012)
 Sam Smith – "Safe with Me" (2013)
 Haim – "The Wire" (2013)
 Chvrches – "Lies" (2013)
 London Grammar – "Sights" (2014)
 Years & Years - "Desire" (2014)
 Shura – "What's It Gonna Be?" (2016)
 Christine and the Queens – "Saint Claude" (2016)
 Wolf Alice - "Don't Delete the Kisses" (2018)
 Rostam - "Gwan" (2018)
 Hozier - "Almost (Sweet Music)" (2019)
 Frere - "Often Wrong" (2020)
 Deftones - "Change (In The House Of Flies)" (2020)
 Sofia Kourtesis - "La Perla" (2021)
 Swedish House Mafia & The Weeknd - "Moth to a Flame" (2022)
 Pheelz - "Finesse (feat. BNXN)" (2022)
 The Range - "Bicameral" (2022)
 Flume - "Sirens feat. Caroline Polachek" (2022)

References

Grammy Award winners
British electronic musicians
English electronic musicians
DJs from London
British songwriters
Living people
1987 births